Michael Thomas Williams (born 5 February 1988) is a Montserratian footballer who plays as a defender.

Career
Williams was part of the Rugby Town squad for 2012–13. In his second-to-last season there was blighted by injuries and he was forced to miss out most of the games.

He later joined Chasetown, whom he left in June 2016, Williams went on to sign for Hednesford Town later in 2016, departing the club five months later.

References

External links 
 National-Football-Teams

1988 births
Living people
Association football defenders
Association football midfielders
Montserratian footballers
Montserrat international footballers
Stafford Rangers F.C. players
Rugby Town F.C. players
Leamington F.C. players
Hinckley A.F.C. players
Stratford Town F.C. players
Hednesford Town F.C. players
Coleshill Town F.C. players
Highgate United F.C. players
Leek Town F.C. players
Northwood F.C. players
Chasetown F.C. players
Willenhall Town F.C. players
Market Drayton Town F.C. players
Rushall Olympic F.C. players
Stone Old Alleynians F.C. players
Northern Premier League players
Southern Football League players